"The Great Game" is the third and final episode of the first series of the television series Sherlock. It was first broadcast on BBC One and BBC HD on 8 August 2010. It was written by Mark Gatiss and directed by Paul McGuigan.

The episode follows Sherlock Holmes (Benedict Cumberbatch) and John Watson (Martin Freeman) as they race to solve a series of seemingly unrelated cases presented by a mysterious bomber. If they fail to solve the case in the time specified by the bomber, he will kill the hostage he is holding. After four such cases, the episode ends in a standoff between Holmes and the bomber, who it turns out is Jim Moriarty, the "consulting criminal" and the main antagonist for the rest of the series. The standoff is left as a cliffhanger until Season 2. Like its predecessors, the episode features numerous references to the works of Arthur Conan Doyle.

Critical reception of "The Great Game" was highly positive, being praised for its complex and gripping plot, and its unusual and original portrayal of Moriarty.

Plot 

Sherlock Holmes is bored without stimulating cases. Mycroft Holmes urges Sherlock to investigate the death of Secret Intelligence Service clerk Andrew West and the disappearance of a flash drive containing missile plans. Sherlock refuses and is called to Scotland Yard where he receives a mobile phone matching the victim's from "A Study in Pink". The phone shows a derelict room, which Sherlock recognises as the long-unoccupied flat 221c; his neighbour. Inside the room is a pair of trainers, and a hostage calls: if Sherlock cannot solve the puzzle in twelve hours, a bomb will kill her. Sherlock traces the trainers to Carl Powers, a schoolboy who reportedly drowned in a swimming pool. Proving the boy was poisoned with botulinum toxin via his eczema medication, Sherlock announces the solution to the bomber, and the hostage is freed.

A second MMS shows a blood-stained sports car; another hostage phones, saying Sherlock has eight hours to solve this mystery. Finding the vehicle without its driver, Sherlock interviews the missing man's wife and the car rental boss, whom he deduces was recently in Colombia. After learning that the blood in the car had been frozen, Sherlock announces that the missing man paid the agency owner to help him disappear, and the hostage is freed. A third message and hostage point Sherlock to the demise of Connie Prince, who allegedly died from tetanus. Sherlock disproves the cause of death, and Watson interviews Prince's brother Kenny; Sherlock pins the crime on the housekeeper Raoul de Santos—Kenny's lover—who murdered Connie by increasing her botox injection. Despite Sherlock solving the puzzle, the hostage is killed for describing the kidnapper.

The fourth message is a photograph of the River Thames, and no hostage calls; Sherlock and the police discover security guard Alex Woodbridge's body on the riverbank. Sherlock claims that Woodbridge was strangled by an assassin called the "Golem" using his bare hands. After tracing Woodbridge's interest in astronomy, Sherlock deduces that the guard had uncovered a forged Johannes Vermeer painting about to be exhibited. While Sherlock examines the painting, a child hostage calls: Sherlock has ten seconds to prove the forgery. He spots a supernova in the painting that post-dates Vermeer, thus stopping the bomb. The museum curator confesses the forgery and outs her accomplice: a man named "Moriarty".

Watson investigates West's death and Sherlock discovers it as the fifth mystery. They track down Joe Harrison, West's potential brother-in-law, who admits to stealing the flash drive and accidentally killing West in an argument; unable to sell it, Harrison keeps the drive. Instead of luring Moriarty with the device, Watson arrives as the fifth hostage, wearing an explosive vest. Moriarty appears and leaves after a brief interaction with Sherlock and Watson. However, as Sherlock takes off Watson's vest, Moriarty returns (having changed his mind) with multiple snipers aiming at Sherlock and Watson. Sherlock then aims his handgun at the explosive vest, intending mutual assured destruction.

Sources and allusions 
As with all episodes of Sherlock, the plot combines those of a number of works by Sir Arthur Conan Doyle.

 Sherlock's surprising ignorance, discussed on John's blog, about several commonplace subjects including astronomy, comes from A Study in Scarlet, as does Holmes' annoyance about ordinary people filling their minds with useless subjects.
 Andrew West, the name of the MI6 clerk, comes from "The Adventure of the Bruce-Partington Plans".
 The third episode of the 2010 BBC Sherlock series titled "The Great Game" made reference to The Five Orange Pips being sent by an assassin organization as a warning. In the episode, these pips were five electronic beeps, like the pips (the time signal) broadcast on the hour by the BBC's analogue radio stations.

Production 
According to the DVD commentary, "The Great Game" was the first episode of Sherlock to be produced after the BBC accepted the series. The series was filmed in reverse order because co-creator Steven Moffat, the writer of the first episode "A Study in Pink", was busy with the fifth series of Doctor Who.

Andrew Scott made his first appearance as Jim Moriarty in "The Great Game". Moffat said, "We knew what we wanted to do with Moriarty from the very beginning. Moriarty is usually a rather dull, rather posh villain so we thought someone who was genuinely properly frightening. Someone who's an absolute psycho." Moffat and Gatiss were originally not going to put a confrontation between Moriarty and Sherlock into the first three episodes, but realised that they "just had to do a confrontation scene. We had to do a version of the scene in 'The Final Problem' in which the two arch-enemies meet each other."

Sherlock's residence at 221B Baker Street was filmed at 185 North Gower Street. Baker Street was impractical because of heavy traffic and the number of things labelled "Sherlock Holmes", which would need to be disguised. The laboratory used by Sherlock was filmed at Cardiff University School of Earth and Ocean Sciences.

"The Great Game" was partly set in a disused sewage works.

Broadcast and reception 
"The Great Game" was first broadcast on BBC One on 8 August 2010. Overnight figures had been watched by 7.34 million viewers on BBC One and BBC HD, a 31.3% audience share. Final viewing figures rose to 9.18 million.

Critical reception was highly positive. Chris Tilly of IGN rated "The Great Game" a 9.5 out of 10, describing it as "gripping from start to finish". Of Moriarty's appearance, he said it "didn't disappoint either, the villain of the piece being unlike any incarnation of the character yet seen on screen". He also praised the writing, saying, "Credit should go to writer Mark Gatiss, his script the perfect combination of classic Conan Doyle storytelling with modern-day plot devices and humour, creating a sophisticated mystery that was the perfect marriage of old and new.", and the performances of Cumberbatch and Freeman. John Teti, writing for The A.V. Club, awarded the episode an A- and called it an "extraordinarily dense 90 minutes". He further singled out Andrew Scott for praise, writing that his "portrayal of Moriarty is a thrilling departure from earlier incarnations of the man". The Guardian Sam Wollaston was optimistic for the programme, describing it as "smart, exciting, and just the right level of confusing" and described "The Great Game" as "a mash-up that totally works" and "an edge-of-the seat ride".

References

External links 

 

2010 British television episodes
Sherlock (TV series) episodes